Shirobako is a 24-episode anime television series produced by P.A. Works and directed by Tsutomu Mizushima. It aired in Japan between October 9, 2014 and March 26, 2015. A manga adaptation began serialization in ASCII Media Works's Dengeki Daioh magazine in September 2014, and a novel was published by Shueisha in January 2015. An anime film premiered on February 29, 2020.

The title Shirobako refers to videos that are distributed to the production staff members prior to their release. These videos were at a time distributed as VHS tapes enclosed in white boxes and are still referred to as "white boxes" (thus the meaning of shirobako) despite the fact that the white enclosures are no longer in use.

Plot
Aoi Miyamori and her four best friends, Ema Yasuhara, Shizuka Sakaki, Misa Tōdō, and Midori Imai, were all part of their school's animation club, promising to make an anime together. Years later, Aoi is now working as a production assistant for the animation production company, Musashino Animation, where Ema also works as an animator, while Shizuka, Misa, and Midori are working as a voice actress, 3D graphics artist, and an aspiring writer respectively. The story mainly focuses on Aoi and her team at Musashino Animation as they work on two different anime projects; an original anime series and a manga adaptation, facing the various obstacles that each project brings with them.

Characters

Main characters

She is a production assistant of Musashino Animation and later the production manager. Having worked at Musashino Animation for a year-and-a-half, she has great driving skills and is acknowledged by her coworkers Erika Yano and Tatsuya Ochiai as suitable for the production industry. However, she admits that she has not officially decided exactly what job she will take in the anime industry.

She is a key animator at Musashino Animation and a former member of the Kaminoyama High School animation club. She is later promoted to the position of assistant general animation supervisor for The Third Aerial Girls Squad. She admires the work of character designer and general animation supervisor Rinko Ogasawara, who is her higher-up. She has a secret that she shares with Iguchi: they do workout dances on the roof together.

She is a voice actress at Akaoni Production and a former member of the Kaminoyama High School animation club. She is called "Zuka" by her friends. She also works part-time as a waitress at a pub. Her first notable role was as Lucy Weller, a character featured in the final episode of Musashino Animation's The Third Girls Aerial Squad anime adaptation.

She is an aspiring 3D computer graphics operator and a former member of the Kaminoyama High School animation club. She once worked at computer graphics studio Super Media Creations, but later quits due to her dissatisfaction with her work and finds employment at Studio Kanabun. Nicknamed "Mii" by her friends, she was initially confused in choosing between working in the fields of 2D and 3D, but ultimately chose the latter. She was inspired to work because of Ema's drawings. She dislikes working on projects that have no plot or emotion behind them, which is the reason she leaves Super Media Creations, as she only designed wheels during her time there.

She is a university student and aspiring story writer. She is a former member of the Kaminoyama High School animation club and is nicknamed "Rii" by her friends. She is the youngest of the group and continues to strive to reach her goal. Her enthusiasm on researching earns her the nickname "Diesel" after she creates a helpful guide for Musashino Animation when they make an informal request for information on engines for Exodus!. She later finds employment at Musashino as a setting instructor, and later assists in the script ordering.

Musashino Animation
Production desk
: Production manager of Musashino Animation. He decides to leave Musashino Animation to become a pastry chef. After his departure, he is revealed to have lost much weight during his sporadic pastry delivery visits to Musashino Animation.
: Production assistant of Musashino Animation. He is later promoted to chief production assistant after Honda's departure. He is known around the company for being irresponsible, loud and being extremely protective of his ego and reputation. This often earns him rebukes from Aoi and Erika, as well as annoyance or indifference from all other characters.
: Production assistant of Musashino Animation. She is Tatsuya and Aoi's closest co-worker, known for a short temper and generous attitude. She lives in Utsunomiya with her sick father, which causes problems with workloads.
: Production assistant of Musashino Animation. He rarely speaks to anyone but Erika although he is respected around the office. He leaves Musashino Animation to become the production manager at Studio Canaan after a former colleague of his requests his assistance.
: New production assistant of Musashino Animation and an otaku. She is very enthusiastic to the point where she forgets what is important.
: New production assistant of Musashino Animation. She is very responsible, but is horrible with directions.
: New production assistant of Musashino Animation after Honda's departure and Tarō's subsequent promotion, although he is in truth very experienced. He is known for being easily annoyed and standoffish. His experience lends him connections to various companies and people in the show, although all of them are mediocre at what they do. When he joins Musashino, due to past "trauma," he initially believes that anime just needs to get finished and that quality does not matter. He later comes around and starts to appreciate what professionals put into their work and that quality does matter.

Animation department
: Star key animator, character designer and general animation supervisor at Musashino Animation. She was the character designer for Exodus!, but after its last episode, she decides to return to her roots as key animator, inspired by Shigeru's horse animations. She is known for her calm demeanor and fashion: gothic dresses. She is also an accomplished softball player.
: Key animator at Musashino Animation. The assistant general animation supervisor of Exodus! and the character designer of The Third Aerial Girls Squad. After her character designs for The Third Aerial Girls Squad were rejected multiple times by Nogame, Rinko lets her in on her secret place: the softball range. Afterwards, she no longer wears typical casual wear, but instead a pinkish kimono with purple stripes. She also does workout dances with Ema on the roof, a secret between the two.
: Key animator at Musashino Animation. The animation supervisor for the Exodus! third and eighth episodes. He has a rivalry with Misato Segawa. He gets annoyed when other characters voice their negative opinions of his work. He loves Idepon, citing it as his inspiration to work in anime, a common ground with Yūichirō Shimoyanagi, a CG animator.
: Key animator at Musashino Animation.
: Key animator at Musashino Animation and Endō's junior. He is a massive proponent of hand-drawn animation being superior to CG animation.
: In-between animator at Musashino Animation. She is later promoted to key animator for The Third Aerial Girls Squad. She is extremely nervous and shy, almost never completing a full word. This leaves her very much attached to Ema, who seemingly magically interprets what she wants to say. She is also deathly afraid of insects.
: Senior key animator at Musashino Animation. He was once the character designer for the now-defunct Musashino Pictures. His old age means he no longer has the speed to work on Musashino Animation's main projects, but he proves crucial to the completion of the final episode of Exodus!, where he teaches the other animators to animate horses, a lost talent by the time Shirobako takes place. In addition to horses, he can design and animate many other animals.

Other staff
: The president of Musashino Animation. He was once the production desk at the now-defunct Musashino Pictures. He is more often than not seen cooking absurd amounts of food for his employees. In the past, he had a distinctive hippie look, with long hair past his shoulders and a headband, but in the present, he is nearly bald and has a distinctive gap between his front two teeth. His name and design are based on producer and animator Masao Maruyama.
: The general manager of Musashino Animation and a former production assistant. She does not tolerate smoking or violence in the office, and is skilled at defusing situations as well. The police have nicknamed her "Woman of the Speed of Sound", as she will drive over the speed limit to deliver episode tapes on time to broadcasting companies around Japan.
: Line producer at Musashino Animation. He is often nicknamed "Nabe-P" by his colleagues.
: Color setter at Musashino Animation.
: Director of photography at Musashino Animation.
: 3D Director at Musashino Animation. He loves Idepon, citing it as his inspiration to work in anime, a common ground with Ryōsuke Endō, a key animator.
: In-between animation inspector at Musashino Animation.
: Editor at Musashino Animation.

Production staff
Directing staff
: The director of Exodus! and The Third Girls Aerial Squad. He loves fatty foods, leaving the air conditioner on, and not working. His work style often leads to him suddenly changing the story or refusing to work on his storyboards, leading to delayed production. He has a fatal flaw when people reference his greatest failure in the past, Jiggly Jiggly Heaven. He is also known for celebrating losing weight by eating unhealthy foods, although he measures this in minuscule amounts of grams. His character and design are in part based on Seiji Mizushima.
: The episode director of Exodus! fourth and ninth episodes, and an episode director for The Third Girls Aerial Squad.
: The episode director of Exodus! third episode, and The Third Aerial Girls Squads third and seventh episodes.
: The episode director of The Third Aerial Girls Squads fifth episode. He is contacted as an emergency by Erika, formerly known as "the bearded hermit", with barely any money. He is used as comic relief as he often attempts to escape Studio Taitanic with many different ways which included tunneling out and escaping through the vents, always only to be caught by Erika smiling at him at the end.
: The former episode director of The Third Aerial Girls Aerial Squads fifth episode, hailing from Studio Taitanic. He is completely disinterested in working with Seiichi or anime in general, referencing Jiggly Jiggly Heaven and signing episode cuts without having seen any of it. He then disappears after meeting with Musashino Animation.

Sound department (R&B Studio)
: Director of audiography.
: Record producer.
: Sound production supervisor.
: Mixer.
: Assistant mixer.
: Sound effects engineer. He also works at Sawara Studio.

Freelance animators
: Freelance key animator. The animation supervisor for the Exodus! fourth and ninth episodes. Ryōsuke Endō considers her a rival, as they have common work history together. She is very diligent, often working throughout the night to exhaustion.
: Freelance key animator. He is very lazy, not working until he is "in his groove", and sleeping well into the afternoon. He is also an avid biker.

Voice actors
: Voice actress. Voices Akane in Exodus!. Her name and appearance are nearly identical to her voice actress Mai Nakahara.
: Voice actress. Voices Aya in Exodus! and Catherine Weller in The Third Aerial Girls Squad. Her name and appearance are nearly identical to her voice actress Shizuka Itō.
: Voice actress. Voices Arupin in Exodus!. Her name and appearance are nearly identical to her voice actress Ai Kayano.
: Voice actress. Voices Onee-san in Exodus!.
: Voice actress. Voices Aria Hitotose in The Third Aerial Girls Squad. Her design is based on Juri Kimura, the voice actress of Aoi Miyamori.
: Voice actress. Voices Noa Ashkenage in The Third Aerial Girls Squad.
: Voice actress. Voices Christine Waldegard in The Third Aerial Girls Squad.
: Voice actress. Voices Tatiana Yakovlef in The Third Aerial Girls Squad.
: Top voice actress. Her design is a play on her voice actress Yukari Tamura.

Others
Other companies
: The editor-in-chief for the company that produces and distributes The Third Aerial Girls Squad.
: An editor for the company that produces and distributes The Third Aerial Girls Squad. Later fired after keeping Nogame in the dark about Musashino's attempts to meet him. He approves everything that the cast asks him without consulting Nogame, often seen texting on his cell phone during meetings with Musashino Animation. He also abruptly leaves his meetings, interrupting conversations to remark on how he scheduled another meeting, although it is heavily implied he is actually performing leisure activities, such as going to a golfing range. He is known for his catch phrase "funny story". He says this extremely liberally, using it in emails and normal conversation where there is no story to be told.
: The president and chief production assistant of A.C Tsuchinoko, and Erika and Hiraoka's former classmate in technical school.
: The president of Super Media Creations and Misa's former boss.
: The president of Studio Kanabun and Misa's current boss.
: Sound effects engineer for the sound department at Sawara Studio.
: The president of The Born. He is known for being blunt, often refusing interview candidates for being nervous or saying certain phrases ("I'll do anything" is a particular one) He is also forgetful, loud and wears a baseball uniform.
: The chief production assistant of The Born. He is Masahiko's foil, often reminding him he is being far too demanding or brusque.
: An episode director working for The Born and a former key animator. He is noted for being "nocturnal", not showing up to work until the late afternoon.
: Aoi's rival, who works at G.I Staff (a combination of Production I.G and J.C. Staff) and frequently races her while on errands for the same people.
: The president of Komoro Studio. He was once the color setter for the now-defunct Musashino Pictures.
: Head of the Yotaka Bookshop Organization.
: Producer for Big Japan Advertising.
: Producer for a firm advertising The Third Girls Aerial Squad.
: The head production assistant at Studio Taitanic. He apparently does nothing at work, sleeping when Erika enters Studio Taitanic and not even turning on the Internet.
: Producer for Bukkomi Games. He, along with Takumi Yarase and Tsuyoshi Makurada, do not care about The Third Aerial Girls Squad, only gaining money for their respective company. Sugesuke particularly wants well-known voice actors in The Third Aerial Girls Squad for to draw extra publicity for games that accompany The Third Aerial Girls Squad. He is forced to agree to Jun's voice actors for the sake of quality.
: Producer for Gorioshi Music. He, along with Sugesuke Enjō and Tsuyoshi Makurada, do not care about The Third Aerial Girls Squad, only gaining money for their respective company. Takumi particularly wants voice actors with good singing capabilities in The Third Aerial Girls Squad so his company can sell more records. He is forced to agree to Jun's voice actors for the sake of quality.
: Creative producer for DK Race. He, along with Sugesuke Enjō and Takumi Yarase, do not care about The Third Aerial Girls Squad, only gaining money for their respective company. Tsuyoshi particularly wants physically attractive voice actors in The Third Aerial Girls Squad so his company will have larger panels at conventions. He is forced to agree to Jun's voice actors for the sake of quality.

Other characters
: Aoi's dolls who she occasionally imagines being alive. Mimuji is a female doll with an eyepatch who wears a long purple and black dress. She is ignorant to the anime creation process and finds the meetings and work boring. She also bullies Roro and serves as the negative voice for Aoi, telling her to quit work and question why she is working in anime. Roro is a white teddy bear who explains the anime creation process. He is the positive voice for Aoi, reminding her why she is working in anime. In Shirobako's final episode credits, Ai Kunogi sees Mimuji and Roro as being alive, which stuns her. 
: Aoi's older sister, who unhappily works at a Shinkin bank. She lives in the country, and acts like a stereotypical tourist during her visit to Tokyo, embarrassing Midori. She questions whether Musashino Animation is a legitimate company, but ultimately approves of Aoi.
: The head writer of Exodus! and one of the writers for The Third Aerial Girls Squad. His name is based on real-life novel author Kinoko Nasu, while his appearance is similar to that of real-life screenwriter Hiroyuki Yoshino.
: Art director for The Third Girls Aerial Squad. He is known for his art direction featuring clouds, as well as his forehead, which is longer than any other character's in the show,
: An art director who is hired to handle certain background scenes for The Third Girls Aerial Squad. He was once a key animator for the now-defunct Musashino Pictures. He is a talented painter. His character and design are in part based upon Hiromasa Ogura.
: A former voice actress and Shizuka's mentor.
: A high-profile animator who was involved in several famous anime works. His name is a play on that of real-life director and animator Hideaki Anno, and his appearance is similar to that of Anno as well. As with Anno, he is most well known for being the art director for a popular mecha anime. In Anno's case, this is Neon Genesis Evangelion.
: Ryōsuke's wife.
: Aoi and Kaori's mother.
: Ema's mother.
: Sugie's wife, who he met at the now-defunct Musashino Pictures, where she worked as an in-between animation supervisor.
: The art director of the now-defunct Musashino Pictures. He is instantly recognizable from his large mustache and his short temper, which he often directed at Masato Marukawa, who as a production assistant requested the art department draw certain things, an unheard-of action in anime.
: The original creator of The Third Girls Aerial Squad. Unlike any other character in the show, he appears to regularly wear traditional Japanese kimonos. His name is based on manga artist Takeshi Nogami.

Anime characters
Exodus!
: The leader of the idol group Tracy, and one of the protagonists of Exodus!. She is voiced by Mei Nakaharu.
: A member of the idol group Tracy, and one of the protagonists of Exodus!. She is voiced by Suzuka Itō.
: A member of the idol group Tracy, and one of the protagonists of Exodus!, who is 29 years old despite publicizing her age as 17. She is voiced by Mui Kayana.
: A shady businesswoman who is in frequent contact with Tracy, who appears to be an antagonist of Exodus!. She is voiced by Yuuna Sakashita.
: An ambitious police inspector transferred from South Africa, who is assigned to track down Akane, Aya, and Arupin on suspicion of murder. She appears to be an antagonist of Exodus!.
: The manager of Tracy, who winds up being murdered and his death pinned on his own idol group.

The Third Girls Aerial Squad
: The main protagonist of The Third Girls Aerial Squad, and a pilot from Japan, sardonically nicknamed "Ice Doll" for her cold and calculating personality. A member of the 307 Aerial Squad, or "Hell Alice", she flies a Mitsubishi F-1. She is voiced by Kyōko Suzuki.
: A pilot from America and one of Aria's allies. A member of Hell Alice, she flies a McDonnell Douglas F-4 Phantom II. She is voiced by Suzuka Itō.
: A pilot from Sweden and one of Aria's allies. A member of Hell Alice, she flies a Saab 37 Viggen. She is voiced by Ayano Makise.
: A pilot from Israel and one of Aria's allies. A member of Hell Alice, she flies an IAI Kfir. She is voiced by Eri Asagami.
: A pilot from an unknown country, and one of Aria's allies. A member of Hell Alice, she flies a Mikoyan-Gurevich MiG-23. She is voiced by Hiroko Tokiwa.
: The commanding officer of Chofu Base and the leader of Hell Alice.
: A lieutenant colonel and the squadron leader of Hell Alice, who sacrifices herself to save Aria and Catherine.
: A rear general who is responsible for overseeing and repairing Hell Alice's aircraft.
: An apparent representative of the Clow Corporation, which supplies Chofu Base with gathered parts.
: Catherine's younger sister, who was specifically created for an anime-original scenario for the adaptation. She is voiced by Shizuka.
: A pilot who participates in the attack against Midway Pillar, during which he is shot down and killed.

Media

Print media
A manga adaptation titled , written by Kenji Sugihara and illustrated by Mizutama, began serialization in the November 2014 issue of ASCII Media Works' Dengeki Daioh magazine sold on September 27, 2014. A short manga based on the show's fictional series The Third Girls Aerial Squad was distributed by Takeshi Nogami at Comiket 88 in August 2015.

A 224-page novel adaptation, titled Shirobako Introduction and written by Michiko Itō and Hajime Tanka, was published by Shueisha under their Jump j Books imprint on January 27, 2015.

Anime

The 24-episode anime television series was produced by P.A. Works. It was directed by Tsutomu Mizushima and written by Michiko Yokote, with the music produced by Shirō Hamaguchi. The series aired on Tokyo MX between October 9, 2014 and March 26, 2015 and was simulcast by Crunchyroll. Original video animation (OVA) episodes featuring fictional anime are included on the series' third and seventh Blu-ray Disc/DVD volumes, released on February 25, 2015 and July 29, 2015, respectively. Sentai Filmworks has licensed the series for release in North America. Madman Entertainment licensed the series in Australia and New Zealand. The complete collection Blu-ray was released on October 13, 2020 with an English dub.

For the first twelve episodes, the opening theme is "Colorful Box" by Yoko Ishida, while the ending theme is "Animetic Love Letter" sung by Juri Kimura, Haruka Yoshimura, and Haruka Chisuga. For episode one, the opening theme is  sung by Tracy (Mai Nakahara, Shizuka Itō, and Ai Kayano), which is later used as the opening theme for the first OVA episode.

At the "Musashi-Sakai x Shirobako Harumatsuri" event held in Tokyo on April 28, 2018, it was announced that the series would receive an all-new anime film, with the main staff from the anime series returning to reprise their roles. The film premiered in Japan on February 29, 2020. On November 17, 2020, it was announced Eleven Arts has licensed the film. The film premiered in North American theaters on August 10, 2021.

Reception
In a review by Anime News Network, reviewer Rose Bridges gave the series an A rating and lauded it for its concept and character development. She particularly praised the characterization and development of main character Aoi Miyamori. She went on to say that "Shirobakos presence brightens the anime world, so I hope this isn't the end. I'm glad it set itself up so that it doesn't have to be." Bridges also alluded to the possibility of a second season several times in her review.

Shirobako won the Animation Kobe Television Award in 2015. It also won Animation of the Year at the 2016 Tokyo Anime Awards and Animation Department Committee Recommended Works Award at the 19th Japan Media Arts Festival.

References

External links
 

2014 anime television series debuts
2015 Japanese novels
Animation making in anime and manga
Anime with original screenplays
ASCII Media Works manga
Bandai Namco franchises
Comedy anime and manga
Dengeki Daioh
Jump J-Books
Metafictional television series
P.A.Works
Sentai Filmworks
Shōnen manga
Shueisha books
Slice of life anime and manga
Television series about television
Tokyo MX original programming